Mimoza Hamidi (born 28 April 1998) is a Kosovo-born Albanian footballer who plays as a forward for Swiss club Basel and has appeared for the Albania women's national team.

Career
Hamidi has been capped for the Albania national team, appearing for the team during the 2019 FIFA Women's World Cup qualifying cycle.

See also
List of Albania women's international footballers

References

External links
 
 
 

1998 births
Living people
Albanian women's footballers
Women's association football forwards
Albania women's international footballers
Albanian expatriate footballers
Albanian expatriate sportspeople in Switzerland
Expatriate women's footballers in Switzerland
People from Preševo
Serbian women's footballers
Serbian expatriate women's footballers
Serbian expatriate sportspeople in Switzerland
Serbian people of Albanian descent
Sportspeople of Albanian descent